Theodor Kleinschmidt (6 March 1834 in Wolfhagen – 10 April 1881 in Utuaia, Bismarck Archipelago) was a German trader, explorer and  naturalist.

Biography 
Kleinschmidt studied commerce and went to the United States of America in 1843. He launched out in business in Saint Louis (Missouri) but went bankrupt and had to leave for Australia then on to Fiji to flee his creditors. But his trade with the natives was not brilliant, in particular because of the economic crisis of 1874. The Museum Godeffroy of Hamburg then offered a new opportunity to him. The institution charged him with collecting natural history specimens, fauna and flora, in the Solomon Islands and New Hebrides, territories largely unexplored hitherto. He was assassinated by natives in 1881. He was the uncle of the priest and ornithologist Otto Kleinschmidt (1870–1954).

Eponym 
The pink-billed parrotfinch (Erythrura kleinschmidti) was named in his honour by Otto Finsch.

References

Literature
 Walther Killy (Hersg.): Enzyklopädie der Biographien. Saur Verlag, München, 2000

1834 births
1881 deaths
People from Wolfhagen
German naturalists
German emigrants to the United States